This is discography of the American rock band Black Rebel Motorcycle Club

Studio albums

EPs
 Screaming Gun EP (October 2001)
 Spread Your Love EP (2002) (Japan)
 Howl Sessions EP (2005)
 Napster Live Session (2007)
 American X: Baby 81 Sessions EP (2007)
 Kings of Leon/Black Rebel Motorcycle Club split EP (2008)

Live albums
 Black Rebel Motorcycle Club Live (2009)
 LIVE in London (2010)
 LIVE in Paris (2015)

Singles

Other contributions
NME Awards 2004: Rare and Unreleased (2004, NME) - "The Hardest Button to Button" (live), White Stripes cover
Southland Tales: Music from the Motion Picture (2007, Milan Entertainment) – "Howl" (extended version)
The Twilight Saga: New Moon: Original Motion Picture Soundtrack (2009, Atlantic Records) – "Done All Wrong"
Batman: Arkham City – The Album (2011, WaterTower Music) – "Shadow on the Run"

References

Discographies of American artists
Rock music group discographies